Poeobius is a genus of marine polychaete worm. It contains the single species Poeobius meseres.

Description
The species is a passive detritivore, using a mucus net to capture marine snow as it hangs neutrally-buoyant midwater. The gelatinous body consist of 11 poorly defined segments with no setae or external segmentation. Only two septa remains, which divides the coelomic cavity into an anterior, middle and posterior coelom. There is no serial duplication of the internal organs.

References

Terebellida
Detritivores
Monotypic annelid genera